Yisa Braimoh (born 12 August 1942) was elected Senator for Edo North Senatorial District of Edo State, Nigeria, taking office on 29 May 2007. He is a member of the People's Democratic Party (PDP).

Braimoh was educated as an engineer at the University of Western Ontario, Ontario Canada (1982), Cranefield Institute of Technology, Cranfield, UK (1981) and Engineering College, Penzance, Cornwall UK (1969-1970).
Before election to the Senate, he was Special Advisor to the Minister of Transport and Aviation (1993), Special Advisor to the Minister of Power and Steel (1994), Member of the Board of Directors of the National Maritime Authority (2000) and Chairman of the Governing Board of NYSC (2005-2007).
 
His election to the Senate in April 2007 was appealed by the Action Congress candidate on the grounds of non-compliance with the Electoral Act 2006. The appeal was eventually dismissed in April 2010.
After being elected Senator, he was appointed to committees on National Planning, Integration and Cooperation, Culture & Tourism and 
Communications.
In April 2010, Braimoh dismissed claims by Mrs Evelyn Igbafe of the Action Congress who described him as a "bench warmer" and a poor representative of the people of his senate district.

References

Living people
1942 births
People from Edo State
Peoples Democratic Party members of the Senate (Nigeria)
University of Western Ontario alumni
Alumni of Cranfield University
21st-century Nigerian politicians